Phiona Nabbumba (born 20 July 2000), also spelled Phionah Nabbumba, is a Ugandan footballer who plays as a midfielder for FUFA Women Super League club She Corporate FC and the Uganda women's national team.

Club career 
Nabbumba has played for She Corporate in Uganda.

International career 
Nabbumba capped for Uganda at senior level during the 2021 COSAFA Women's Championship.

References

External links 

2000 births
Living people
People from Wakiso District
Ugandan women's footballers
Women's association football midfielders
Uganda women's international footballers
21st-century Ugandan women